Boophis rhodoscelis is a species of frog in the family Mantellidae.

It is endemic to Madagascar.
Its natural habitats are subtropical or tropical moist lowland forests, subtropical or tropical moist montane forests, subtropical or tropical high-altitude grassland, and rivers.
It is threatened by habitat loss.

Sources

 Andreone, F., Vences, M. & Vallan, D. 2004.  Boophis rhodoscelis   2006 IUCN Red List of Threatened Species.   Downloaded on 23 July 2007.

rhodoscelis
Endemic frogs of Madagascar
Amphibians described in 1882
Taxonomy articles created by Polbot